The Golden Gate International Exposition (GGIE) (1939 and 1940), held at San Francisco's Treasure Island, was a World's Fair celebrating, among other things, the city's two newly built bridges. The San Francisco–Oakland Bay Bridge opened in 1936 and the Golden Gate Bridge in 1937. The exposition opened from February 18, 1939, through October 29, 1939, and from May 25, 1940, through September 29, 1940.

History
The idea to hold a World's Fair to commemorate the completion of the Bay Bridge and Golden Gate Bridge started from a letter to The San Francisco News in February 1933. Architects W.P. Day and George Kelham were assigned to consider the merits of potential sites around the city, including Golden Gate Park, China Basin, Candle Stick Point, and Lake Merced. By 1934, the choice of sites had been narrowed to the areas adjoining the two bridges: either "an island built up from shallow water" north of Yerba Buena Island which would go on to be named Treasure Island, or the Presidio, which had previously been used in 1915 for the Panama–Pacific International Exposition. Yerba Buena Shoals was chosen as the site in February 1935. In August 1935, a $10 million proposal using federal WPA funds for construction work was advanced, and in October of that year, Leland W. Culter, president of San Francisco Bay Exposition, Inc., announced that President Roosevelt had approved  to help fund the cost of reclaiming land at Yerba Buena Shoals.

San Francisco Bay Exposition was incorporated on July 24, 1934.

Initial schedules called for the fair to open on February 18, 1939, and to close on December 2, 1939, hosting a projected attendance of 20,000,000 people. Construction would employ 3,000, and running the fair would require a workforce of 10,000.

Treasure Island

Treasure Island, a flat, geometrically shaped, artificial island attached to Yerba Buena Island, was built for the Exposition near where the Oakland span and the San Francisco span of the Bay Bridge join. The dredging of Treasure Island started on February 11, 1936.  of fill were required for the  site. Initial schedules called for the completion of dredging by the end of 1936.

Built by the federal government, Treasure Island was intended to serve as the municipal airport for San Francisco, an idea which had first been advanced in 1931. Air service would have included Pan American's transpacific flying boats, like the China Clipper. Due to wartime needs, it was taken over by the US Navy as Naval Station Treasure Island from 1941 to 1997.

First closing
The fair closed on October 29, 1939, and efforts to reopen the fair in 1940 were initially abandoned in December 1939.

Attractions

Pageant of the Pacific

The theme of the exposition was "Pageant of the Pacific", as it showcased the goods of nations bordering the Pacific Ocean. The theme was physically symbolized by "The Tower of the Sun;" by an 80-foot statue of Pacifica, goddess of the Pacific ocean; and by architect Mark Daniels' Chinese village.

The San Francisco Downtown Association created the 49-Mile Scenic Drive to promote the exposition and the city. The drive started at San Francisco City Hall and ended on Treasure Island after winding around the "City by the Bay."

Architecture
W.P. Day, a locally prominent architect, was appointed director of works and George W. Kelham served as the chief architect until his death in October 1936, when he was succeeded by Arthur Brown Jr.

Fine arts
During the Expo in 1939, Master carver John Wallace (Haida) demonstrated the art of carving totem poles for visitors.

The Art in Action exhibition was staged at GGIE during its second session in the summer of 1940 to show artists at work and attract visitors.

The 1939 NCAA basketball tournament
As part of the exposition, the California Coliseum, located near the grounds' northeast corner, hosted the Western Regional semifinal and Final rounds of the first-ever NCAA Division I men's basketball tournament. The Coliseum, listed in NCAA guidebooks as having a capacity of 9,476, hosted two Elite Eight games and a Final Four game (before 1952, there were only two regions and the champions met in the National Championship game, which was the only game played at what is now considered a "Final Four" site). The Western regional included the Oklahoma Sooners, Oregon Webfoots, Texas Longhorns, and Utah State Aggies. In the opening of round of Regional semifinals (now referred to as the Elite Eight), Oregon beat Texas 56-41 and Oklahoma beat Utah State 50-39. In the Regional Final round (now known as the national semifinal round), the Webfoots beat the Sooners 55-37, advancing to the National Championship game in Evanston, Illinois, where they won the first ever national championship 46-30 over the Ohio State Buckeyes. There was also a regional third-place game played in the Coliseum, which was won by the Aggies, 51-49.

Gayway

The GGIE featured a  midway named the "Gayway" after a contest was held in 1938 to name the Amusement Zone.

One of the more successful attractions in the Gayway featured Sally Rand, who starred in "Sally Rand's Nude Ranch" (styled as "Sally Rand's NDude Ranch"); a contemporary publicity postcard shows Rand posing with female ranch hands, called "Nudies", as strategically placed fence boards conceal implied nudity. Other Gayway sights included sideshow-style attractions, such as little people in a Western setting and a racetrack featuring monkeys driving automobiles.

Transportation

The Key System ran special trains to the fair from the East Bay area during the first year, bearing the "X" designation for "Exposition".  These trains ran along the same East Bay routes as the Key transbay trains, and used the same rolling stock, the "bridge units", but instead of using the newly opened bridge railway, they were diverted to the old Key System ferry pier ("mole") as there was no stop available at Yerba Buena Island.  A ferry crossed the relatively short span of water between the end of the pier and Treasure Island.  This service ended at the close of the first phase of the exposition at the end of 1939.  In 1940, the "X" train-ferry service was entirely replaced by Key System buses, also designated "X".

The Atchison, Topeka and Santa Fe Railway started a passenger train, the Valley Flyer, to carry passengers between Bakersfield and Oakland during the exposition. The Chicago, Burlington, and Quincy Railroad, Denver and Rio Grande Western Railroad, and the Western Pacific Railroad launched the Exposition Flyer passenger service between Chicago and Oakland, named for the Golden Gate International Exposition.

The adventurer and travel author Richard Halliburton, sailing his Chinese junk Sea Dragon to San Francisco from Hong Kong, perished in a typhoon while crossing the Pacific on his way to the exposition in March 1939.

Legacy
In October 2010, the National Building Museum in Washington, D.C. opened an exhibition titled Designing Tomorrow: America’s World’s Fairs of the 1930s. This exhibition, which was available for view until September 2011, prominently featured the Golden Gate International Exposition.

Many of the art pieces that were created from the Art in Action exhibition, including the Pan American Unity mural by Diego Rivera, three Dudley C. Carter wood carvings, and two Frederick E. Olmsted sculptures are now housed and displayed at City College of San Francisco.

The Fauna and Flora of the Pacific mural by Miguel Covarrubias is now on display at the de Young museum in San Francisco. The colorful and oversized map depicts the four Pacific Rim continents with examples of their flora and fauna suspended in a swirling Pacific Ocean populated with sea creatures.

See also
Art in Action, the live art exhibition that took place at the GGIE
 Panama–Pacific International Exposition (1915 San Francisco World's Fair)
 Pan American Unity mural
Official Guide Book
The Magic City, Treasure Island, 1939-1940

References

Bibliography

External links

1939 San Francisco - approximately 140 links. Retrieved 26 June 2019.
Golden Gate International Exposition Publicity Records. Yale Collection of Western Americana, Beinecke Rare Book and Manuscript Library.
Golden Gate International Exposition, 1936-1946. California State Library::California History Room.

Art
The Diego Rivera Mural Project

Videos
Color movie footage of 1939 SF World's Fair

Photographs
Snap Shooting Around the Golden Gate International Exposition (online photo archive), The Bancroft Library
Seymour Snaer photos from 1939
Documentary Exposition photos by Ned Scott
Golden Gate International Exposition

 
1939 in California
1940 in California
1939 in the United States
Historic American Buildings Survey in California
History of the West Coast of the United States
Treasure Island, San Francisco
1930s in San Francisco
1940s in San Francisco